Mazraeh may refer to:

Ardabil Province
 Mazraeh, Khalkhal, a village in Khalkhal County

East Azerbaijan Province
 Mazraeh, Ahar, a village in Ahar County
 Mazraeh, Shabestar, a village in Shabestar County
 Mazraeh, Varzaqan, a village in Varzaqan County

Fars Province
 Mazraeh, Abadeh, a village in Abadeh County
 Mazraeh, Neyriz, a village in Neyriz County

Golestan Province
 Mazraeh, Golestan
 Mazraeh-ye Jonubi Rural District
 Mazraeh-ye Shomali Rural District

Hamadan Province
 Mazraeh, Hamadan
 Mazraeh, Kabudarahang, Hamadan Province
 Mazraeh, Razan, Hamadan Province

Hormozgan Province
 Mazraeh, Hormozgan

Isfahan Province
 Mazraeh, Isfahan

Khuzestan Province
 Mazraeh, Khuzestan
 Mazraeh, Shush, Khuzestan Province

Markazi Province
 Mazraeh, Khomeyn, a village in Khomeyn County
 Mazraeh, Shazand, a village in Shazand County

Qazvin Province
 Mazraeh, Qazvin

West Azerbaijan Province
 Mazraeh, Chaldoran, a village in Chaldoran County
 Mazraeh, Sardasht, a village in Sardasht County
 Mazraeh, Vazineh, a village in Sardasht County

Yazd Province
 Mazraeh, Yazd

See also
 Mazraeh is a common element in Iranian place names; see .